The UCI Track Cycling World Championships – Women's points race is the women's world championship points race event held annually at the UCI Track Cycling World Championships. A demonstration, non-Championship event was staged in 1988 with the first World Championship taking place in 1989. Ingrid Haringa of the Netherlands is the most successful cyclist in the history of this event, with four gold medals.

Medalists

Medal table

External links
Track Cycling World Championships 2016–1893 bikecult.com
World Championship, Track, Points race, Elite cyclingarchives.com

 
Women's points race
Lists of UCI Track Cycling World Championships medalists